Kulayevo (Qolay) is a rural locality (a village) in Kainlykovsky Selsoviet, Burayevsky District, Bashkortostan, Russia. The population was 374 as of 2010. There are 4 streets.

Geography 
Kulayevo is located 16 km southwest of Burayevo (the district's administrative centre) by road. Kushmanakovo is the nearest rural locality.

References 

Rural localities in Burayevsky District